Armitage Shanks is a British manufacturer of bathroom fixtures and plumbing supplies, now part of the group Ideal Standard.

In 2004, Armitage Shanks had eight factories in the United Kingdom, the largest in Armitage, Staffordshire. Armitage Shanks is one of the sponsors of the Loo of the Year Awards.

History

The company that became Armitage Shanks was founded in 1817, by Thomas Bond in Armitage, Staffordshire. The Armitage "sanitary pottery manufacture" became a successful toilet manufacturer in the United Kingdom. In 1907, Armitage Ware Limited was incorporated.

In 1969, Armitage merged with Shanks Holdings Limited, a competing "sanitary engineering company" that was established in 1878 in Barrhead near Glasgow, Renfrewshire, producing the famous brand name Armitage Shanks.

In 1980, Armitage Shanks was purchased by Blue Circle Industries, and in February 1999, Blue Circle sold its bathroom division (consisting of Armitage Shanks and the Italian Ceramica Dolomite) to United States based American Standard Companies for US$430 million.

Following this purchase, the Armitage Shanks brand continued in the United Kingdom, and their former export markets. American Standard were acquired by Bain Capital in February 2007, and is now majority owned by Sun Capital Partners.

References

External links
Armitage Shanks corporate site

Ceramics manufacturers of England
British brands
Companies based in Stoke-on-Trent
Manufacturing companies established in 1817
1817 establishments in England
Bathroom fixture companies
British companies established in 1817